Eric-Louis Bessi (born 23 November 1958) is a Monegasque judoka. He competed at the 1984 Summer Olympics and the 1988 Summer Olympics. His son, Cedric, also represented Monaco in judo at the Olympics, competing at the 2020 Summer Games.

References

External links
 

1958 births
Living people
Monegasque male judoka
Olympic judoka of Monaco
Judoka at the 1984 Summer Olympics
Judoka at the 1988 Summer Olympics
Place of birth missing (living people)